is a Japanese-born American engineer and entrepreneur currently serving as a chairman of Crunchyroll. He established Funimation, a company that distributes anime in Canada and the United States. He served as its president until 2019 when he stepped down. As of October 2011, Fukunaga was named chairman of online video game publisher GameSamba.

Biography 
Fukunaga was born in Itami, Hyōgo, Japan, and grew up in West Lafayette, Indiana in the United States. He graduated from West Lafayette High School in 1979.

Fukunaga attended Purdue University where he got his BSEE in 1982 and his MSEE in 1984. He later moved to Boca Raton, Florida to work as an engineer for IBM. He then attended Columbia Business School, obtaining an MBA in 1989. He held a position with Andersen Consulting (now Accenture) before getting a job with Tandem Computers in Sunnyvale, California.

Fukunaga is also the co-founder and manager of EchoLight Studios, a Texas-based Christian television production company run by Rick Santorum. EchoLight initially shared office space with Fukunaga's Funimation.

Originally, Toei Animation told Funimation that they could not have the Dragon Ball series. However, Fukunaga's uncle, Nagafumi Hori, was one of the producers for Toei Company and helped him convince Toei Animation to give the license to Funimation. So Fukunaga went to a coworker named Daniel Cocanougher, whose family owned a feed mill in Decatur, Texas, and convinced the Cocanougher family to sell their business and invest in creating a production company. With that, FUNimation Productions was established in 1994.

In 2005, Funimation was acquired by the Navarre Corporation for US$100.4 million, Fukunaga still remained the company's CEO. In 2011, the company was sold to a group of investors which included Fukunaga himself. In 2017, 95% of Funimation was sold to Sony Pictures Television Networks for US$143 million, with Fukunaga retaining a 5% stake.

In 2019, Fukanaga stepped down as general manager of Funimation and became the company's chairman. Funimation was renamed to Crunchyroll in 2022 when it acquired the streaming service a year before.

Personal life 
Fukunaga is married to Cindy Brennan, who also was a co-founder and former executive producer at Funimation. They have three children. He has one sister, Nina Fukunaga Johnson, who is a radiation oncologist in Michigan.

References

External links 
 Gen Fukunaga biography writeup at Purdue University Alumni
 Gen Fukunaga at LinkedIn
 
 

1962 births
20th-century American businesspeople
American businesspeople in the online media industry
American people of Japanese descent
American mass media company founders
American software engineers
American television executives
Anime industry
Businesspeople from Texas
Businesspeople from Indiana
Columbia Business School alumni
Engineers from Texas
Engineers from Indiana
Funimation
IBM employees
People from Itami, Hyōgo
Japanese emigrants to the United States
Living people
People from Roanoke, Texas
People from West Lafayette, Indiana
Purdue University College of Engineering alumni